Domaine de Bargylus is a wine estate on the slopes of the Coastal Mountain Range in Syria.  These mountains, known as Mount Bargylus in the Hellenistic and Roman periods, produced notable wines up until the rise of Islam.
Domaine de Bargylus is managed by two brothers Karim and Sandro Saadé, with the assistance of renowned consultant Stéphane Derenoncourt.
It has been cited by wine critic Jancis Robinson as "arguably the finest wine of the Eastern Mediterranean".

History
The Saadé family began works on the winery in 2003. The first vintage was produced in 2006. The Saadé family, of Orthodox Christian origins, is originally from the coastal city of Latakia, known in ancient times as Laodicea ad Mare (i.e. "Laodicea-by-the-sea"). The Saadé family traces its mercantile roots to the 18th and 19th century with prominent representatives such as Gabriel Saadé (1854-1939) and Rodolphe Saadé (1900-1956). With an initial involvement in commodities’ trading and various industries, the family developed maritime and land transport activities on the initiative of Johnny Saadé, Rodolphe’s son, in Syria, Lebanon, Jordan, Iraq, and France. 
Johnny Saadé shifted his activities to the wine making, tourism and real estate fields.

The family owns another winery in Lebanon's Beqaa valley, Château Marsyas.

Other members of this Latakian family are Syrian intellectual and historian Gabriel W.Saadé (1922-1997) and his niece Leila Badre, a prominent Lebanese-Syrian archaeologist.

Grape varieties
Bargylus uses Cabernet Sauvignon, Syrah and Merlot grapes for its red wines, and Chardonnay and Sauvignon blanc grapes for its white wines.

Soil
Limestone is a dominant geological component of the area where the vineyard is situated.

References

External links
Bargylus Wines Syria – winery official website
Lebanon – Sunning grapes The first wine from the Johnny R. Saadé family was the Syrian Bargylus, whose grapes are grown on 20 hectares of land at Jebel al-Ansariyeh on the outskirts of the port city of Lattakia and which produced its first harvest in 2006. (archived 21 July 2015)
'Very old world' wine makes a comeback in Lebanon and Syria CNN: Inside the Middle East 18 December 2009
Lebanese-Syrian Brothers Look West, The New York Times, 16 March 2012
First Syrian wine to hit UK, Decanter.com, 12 March 2012
The global grapevine, ft.com, 21 April 2012
Syrian Vintner Carries On in a Time of War, PRI's The World, 7 June 2013
Top 100 Making An Impact In The Arab World, Forbes Middle-east (archived 3 November 2015)
Syrian vineyard making the world's most dangerous wine, The Telegraph
Making wine in a war zone: Syria's 'dream' vineyard, BBC news
How one family is keeping winemaking alive in Syria, South China Morning Post 
Anson on Thursday: The five bottle cure – inspiring wine stories of 2015, Decanter
Determined syrian winery launches in HK, The Drinks Business
Vinexpo Bordeaux : Produire son vin en Syrie, une bataille au quotidien, La Revue du Vin de France
The most dangerous wine in the world: Incredible story of how grapes from war-torn Syria are smuggled out, Mirror
Wines of War, Wine Spectator
Fractious vintage: 'The most dangerous wine the world', The Irish Times
News from the Middle East, Financial Times
This New Book Will Take You Around The World In Eighty Wines, Forbes magazine
Syrie: le vin le plus dangereux du monde, Arte TV

Wineries of Syria
Syrian brands